Kostivere Landscape Conservation Area is a nature park situated in Harju County, Estonia.

Its area is 112 ha.

The protected area was designated in 1959 to protect Kostivere Karst Area and its surrounding areas.

References

Nature reserves in Estonia
Geography of Harju County